The München RFC is a German rugby union club from Munich, currently playing in the 2nd Rugby-Bundesliga.

History
While rugby had been played in Munich and Bavaria before the interception of the MRFC in 1977, four clubs existed in the city in the 1920s and 1930s, the club's game on 10 June 1978 was the first proper game of rugby played in the city of Munich in almost 50 years.

Rugby had been in hibernation in Bavaria since the days of the Nazis and when US soldiers in the garrison of Augsburg formed a team in 1974, it was the first post-war rugby club to be formed in Bavaria. After a number of other military teams were formed in the following years, MRFC became the first civilian club to be formed in the state in 1977, by British expats, mostly from Wales. The club was formed in a pub in the Isarvorstadt and played its first game that autumn.

The first game it played in Munich, in June 1978, was against the Bad Tölz US Army and it took another year to play its first German opponent, RC Rottweil, on 30 June 1979. Not until 1985 was a second non-military team established in Bavaria, the rugby department of TuS Fürstenfeldbruck.

The club was officially registered in 1982 and in July 1983 attained incorporated status (German: e.V.). However, it could not obtain a regular home ground in Munich and had to play its matches in Fürstenfeldbruck.

Due to Bavaria neither having a league nor a rugby federation in those days, the club had to join the Regionalliga in neighbouring Baden-Württemberg in 1984.

In 1990, the club's long term coach, Rory Donoghue, signed up and a generation change was carried out within it. A quick result of this was the winning of the South German Championship in 1991.

MRFC finally obtained a home ground within Munich, Am Hedernfeld and was promoted to the 2nd Bundesliga South in 1992, where it only lasted for one season.

After two seasons back in tier three, the club once more won promotion to the second division in 1995. A year later, the club became one of the founding members of the Bavarian Rugby Federation, the RVBY.

In 1998, the club celebrated promotion to the Rugby-Bundesliga for the first time, only to be denied a licence and having to stay in division two.

In 2000, the MRFC finally reached the top-tier of German rugby through a third place in the Bundesliga qualification round. Its first season in the new league was reasonably successful and any other year, a second place in the spring qualification round would have been enough to hold on to its league place but a restructuring of the German league system, but the move from two to a single division Bundesliga meant, RFC had to return to the 2nd Bundesliga.

MRFC won the championship in the 2nd Bundesliga in 2002, won against North/East champion Post SV Berlin, meant promotion back to the elite league.

Again, the stay in the Bundesliga lasted for only one season and the team was relegated back down immediately, without a win and 14 losses.

Since then, the club has been playing in the 2nd Bundesliga South/East as a mid-table side. In 2004, it was joined there by local rival StuSta München. Another promotion to the Bundesliga was not in sight in 2008-09 either, with the team coming fourth in the league once more.

In the 2012-13 season the club competed in the 2nd Bundesliga, finishing in the upper half of the table and qualifying for the play-offs for the DRV-Pokal. The club advanced to the semi finals of the play-offs where it was knocked out by Heidelberger TV.

The club once more qualified for the play-offs to the DRV-Pokal in 2013–14, where it was knocked out by USV Potsdam Rugby in the first round. In the 2014–15 season the club finished first in the south-west Liga-Pokal group and lost to the reserve team of TSV Handschuhsheim n the final after a first round bye and victories over RC Dresden and TuS 95 Düsseldorf.

The 2015-16 Season was the most successful Season in the club's history. Munich RFC won both the 2nd Bundesliga South and the Bavarian Regionalliga for the first time in the club's history. The first team went on to the Play Off Final to decide whether they would gain promotion to the highest level in German Rugby. MRFC lost to Luxembourg Rugby Club in a very close final 12-9.

In 2017 the Club moved from the old training facility in Giesing to a new state of the art 4G training pitch in Großhadern. Directly next to the match day home ground (see Home Ground). In the same year Munich RFC celebrated the 40th Anniversary of the club.

Since 2002, the club also has a women's team and with Yvonne Schwarzkopf its first German international.

Club honours
 2nd Rugby-Bundesliga
 Champions: 2002, 2016
 2nd Rugby-Bundesliga South/West
 Champions: 2002, 2016
 Runners-up: 2010
 Bayern Regionalliga
 Champions: 2016

Recent seasons
Recent seasons of the club:

Men

First team

 Until 2001, when the single-division Bundesliga was established, the season was divided in autumn and spring, a Vorrunde and Endrunde, whereby the top teams of the Rugby-Bundesliga would play out the championship while the bottom teams together with the autumn 2nd Bundesliga champion would play for Bundesliga qualification. The remainder of the 2nd Bundesliga teams would play a spring round to determine the relegated clubs. Where two placing's are shown, the first is autumn, the second spring. In 2012 the Bundesliga was expanded from ten to 24 teams and the 2nd Bundesliga from 20 to 24  with the leagues divided into four regional divisions.

Reserve team

Women

References

External links
 Official website
 Bavarian rugby association
 MRFC team info at totalrugby.de
 Tables and results of German rugby on rugbyweb.de

German rugby union clubs
Rugby clubs established in 1977
Rugby union in Munich
1977 establishments in West Germany